Nokia E51 is a Symbian OS smartphone by Nokia announced on 18 September 2007 as the replacement of the Nokia E50 in the business-focused Eseries line. It was the second Nokia UMTS / HSDPA dual band device. The phone was available with a black, silver or bronze-coloured border and backplate. It has a slim body made of stainless steel (12 mm thick, 100 g weight), and was the smallest Nokia smartphone of the time, yet is still technologically capable like other S60 devices of the time. A version without the integrated camera also existed. The E51 was highly acclaimed and was succeeded by the Nokia E52.

Specifications sheet

See also
 Smartphone
 Nokia Eseries

References

External links

 Nokia E51 - Nokia Europe product page
 Nokia E51 - Device Details

Reviews, photos and videos

 Nokia E51 - Review by Smape
 Nokia E51 - Review by All About Symbian
 Nokia E51 - Review by CNET Asia
 Nokia E51 - Review by Mobile-review.com
 Nokia E51 - Review by MobileBurn
 Nokia E51 - Review by GSM Arena
 Nokia E51 - Review by Phone Arena
 Nokia E51 - Review by TrustedReviews
 Nokia E51 - Review by Register Hardware
 Nokia E51 - Video Review by The Smartphones Show

Mobile phones introduced in 2007
Nokia ESeries
Mobile phones with infrared transmitter

de:Nokia Eseries#Nokia E51